Nathalia Sánchez Cárdenas (born 7 June 1992) is a Colombian artistic gymnast who represented Colombia at the 2008 Beijing Summer Olympics.

Achievements
2nd place on bars – World Cup series (Glasgow, Scotland) - 2008
3rd place on beam – World Cup series (Maribor, Slovenia) - 2008
1st place on beam – World Cup series (Porto, Portugal) - 2010
2nd place on bars – World Cup series (Porto, Portugal) - 2010

Winner of Exatlón 2021.

References

External links
 
 
 
 

1992 births
Living people
People from Villavicencio
Colombian female artistic gymnasts
Gymnasts at the 2008 Summer Olympics
Pan American Games competitors for Colombia
Olympic gymnasts of Colombia
Central American and Caribbean Games gold medalists for Colombia
Central American and Caribbean Games silver medalists for Colombia
Central American and Caribbean Games bronze medalists for Colombia
Competitors at the 2006 Central American and Caribbean Games
Competitors at the 2010 Central American and Caribbean Games
South American Games bronze medalists for Colombia
South American Games medalists in gymnastics
Competitors at the 2006 South American Games
Central American and Caribbean Games medalists in gymnastics
20th-century Colombian women
21st-century Colombian women